James Hamilton FLS (27 November 1814 – 24 November 1867) was a Scottish minister and a prolific author of religious tracts.

Life
Born in Paisley, Scotland, seven miles west-southwest of Glasgow, Hamilton was the eldest son of William Hamilton, a Church of Scotland minister of Strathblane and religious author of local renown. James Hamilton was therefore destined from an early age to enter the ministry, and to that end he studied at the universities of Glasgow and Edinburgh. He enjoyed courses on the natural sciences, particularly chemistry and botany, and contemplated a career in one of those fields. Although Hamilton enjoyed poetry, he once read a novel by Sir Walter Scott and had the following reaction:

He became assistant to Robert Smith Candlish at St. George's Church in Edinburgh, in 1838, and upon finishing his college studies, he was licensed to preach by the Presbytery of Edinburgh in 1839 and "commenced his clerical life as assistant minister in the small secluded parish of Abernyte, in Perthshire". In January 1841, he was formally ordained as a minister, at Roxburgh Church in south Edinburgh, and in July of that year became pastor of the National Scotch Church, Regent Square, London, where he would remain until his death. In 1849 he became editor of the Presbyterian Messenger, and in 1864 editor of Evangelical Christendom, the organ of the Evangelical Alliance. He was an incessant literary worker and the author of some of the most widely circulated books of his day. His best known works were: Life in Earnest (London, 1845), of which 64,000 copies had been sold before 1852; The Mount of Olives (1846); The Royal Preacher (1851), a homiletical commentary on Ecclesiastes; and Our Christian Classics (4 vols., 1857–59). Following his death, his collected works were published in London (6 vols., 1869–73); and his Select Works appeared in New York (4 vols., 1875). In addition to his religious writings, Hamilton continued to have an interest in botany throughout his life, publishing several articles in journals on the subject.

Family

In 1847 he married Anne Hovenden Moore (d.1886) daughter of John Moore of Calcutta. Their children included:

Anne Hamilton (1849-1910) married Sir Frederick Wills, 1st Baronet.
James Hamilton (1850-1911)
Mary Isabella Hamilton (1853-1887) married Alexander Lawrence
Christina Jean Hamilton (1856-1885)
Herbert William Hamilton (b.1861)
Ada Frances Hamilton (1864-1902)

References

Citations

Sources

External links

 
 

1814 births
1867 deaths
Burials at Highgate Cemetery
People from Paisley, Renfrewshire
Alumni of the University of Edinburgh
19th-century Ministers of the Church of Scotland